"Invisible Light" is a song by American band Scissor Sisters, serving as the third and final single from their third studio album Night Work. The track, which features guest spoken-word vocals by actor Sir Ian McKellen, is what lead singer Jake Shears felt should have been the first single released for Night Work, even after his going with "Fire with Fire".

Music video
The video for "Invisible Light" features a woman having a series of nightmares. She sees herself being dragged into the woods by a group of men, sleeping in a boat on a river, and attending her own funeral. The song itself was cut down from its six-minute album length into a radio edit of four minutes in length, and features the vocals of Sir McKellen spoken through an actor portraying a hypnotist. The bands' members describe the video as "a magical trip down the rabbit hole". The video is inspired by the nightmares of Mia Farrow in Rosemary's Baby and Catherine Deneuve in Belle de jour. Liz Taylor's version of Cleopatra also appears as a character in the video.

Track listing

References

2010 singles
Scissor Sisters songs
Song recordings produced by Stuart Price
Songs written by Babydaddy
Songs written by Jake Shears
Songs written by Ana Matronic
2010 songs